The C&C SR 33 is a racing sailboat that was designed by Glenn Henderson and first built in 1992.

Production
The design was initially built by Henderson himself and he completed about two examples starting in 1992. The design and tooling was then sold to the Canadian company C&C Yachts, who built about six more. Only eight boats were completed in total.

Design
The SR 33 is a small racing keelboat, built predominantly of fibreglass. It has a fractional sloop rig, a nearly plumb stem, a reverse transom, an internally-mounted spade-type rudder controlled by a tiller and a lifting fin keel. It displaces .

The boat may be optionally fitted with an inboard motor for docking and maneuvering.

The design has a PHRF racing average handicap of 75 with a high of 81 and low of 69.

See also
List of sailing boat types

Related development
C&C SR 21
C&C SR 25
C&C SR 27

Similar sailboats
Abbott 33

BB 10 (keelboat)
C&C 3/4 Ton
C&C 33
C&C 101
CS 33
DB-1
DB-2
Endeavour 33
Hunter 33
Hunter 33-2004
Hunter 33.5
Hunter 333
Hunter 336
Hunter 340
Marlow-Hunter 33
Mirage 33
Moorings 335
Nonsuch 33
San Juan 33S
Tanzer 10
Tartan Ten
Viking 33

References

Keelboats
1990s sailboat type designs
Sailing yachts
Sailboat type designs by Glenn Henderson
Sailboat types built by C&C Yachts